Airlock is a platfom video game for the Atari 2600 published by Data Age in 1982. The player runs and jumps through the interior of a crippled submarine with only ten seconds to complete each level.

Gameplay

Reception
Frank Lovece, writing for Electronic Fun with Computers & Games in 1982, disliked that "there's little to the game once you've passed the first level." He pointed out that because the remaining time carries over to subsequent levels, the game gets easier as you progress.

In a review long after the game's release, Keita Iida concluded: "Graphics are drab in typical Data Age fashion, and sounds consist of nothing more than blips and beeps. On the other hand, it's one of the better efforts by one of the first casualties of the classic videogame era... although that's not saying much."

References

External links
Airlock at Atari Mania

1982 video games
Atari 2600 games
Atari 2600-only games
North America-exclusive video games
Platform games
Video games developed in the United States